Aranbizkarra is a village council Vitoria-Gasteiz, a city in Álava, Basque Country, Spain. 

Populated places in Álava